AgStar Financial Services is a US Farm Credit System Agricultural Credit Association (ACA) that delivers a wide range of farm and rural credit programs and services in 67 counties located in Minnesota and northwest Wisconsin. AgStar provides financial products including agricultural loans, leases, crop insurance, life insurance, and home mortgages. The financial services offered include appraisals, money market accounts, online banking, and other consulting services.

As an ACA cooperative it is owned by 15,200 client-shareholders to whom it provides returns through patronage refunds. It has its headquarters in Mankato, MN and is one of the larger Farm Credit associations in the nation. It is located within AgriBank Farm Credit Bank's district, who acts as a wholesale lender for AgStar. For 2015 it reported $123.9 million in net profit and $8.36 billion in assets, up from the 2014 reported values of $117.4 million in net profit and $7.67 billion in assets.

On July 1, 2017, AgStar Financial Services, Farm Credit Services and Badgerland Financial joined together to form Compeer Financial. The merger was approved from the Farm Credit Association.

Executives

References

External links
 
 AgStar Fund for Rural America

Financial services companies established in 1916
Companies based in Minnesota
Financial services companies of the United States
Mankato, Minnesota
Farm Credit System
Agriculture in Minnesota
Agriculture in Wisconsin